Ayere (Uwu) is a divergent Volta–Niger language of Nigeria, closely related only to Ahaan.

It is named after Ayere village in Ijumu LGA, Kogi State. The village of Ayere roughly consists of 10000 people, according to census.

Distribution
According to Ethnologue, Ayere is spoken in:
Ondo state: Akoko North West LGA
Kogi state: Ijumu LGA (in Ayere village)

See also
Ayere-Ahan word lists (Wiktionary)

References

External links 
 ELAR archive of Documentation of Uwu (Ayere)

Ayere–Ahan languages
Languages of Nigeria